Grouvellina canaliculata is a species of ground beetle in the subfamily Rhysodinae. It was described by Laporte, Comte de Castelnau, in 1836.

References

Grouvellina
Beetles described in 1836